Colleen was a rowboat used on Okanagan Lake in British Columbia, Canada in the late 1800s and early 1900s. She belonged to the Reverend Thomas Greene and served many early settlers and pioneers of the Okanagan, including W. D. Walker and Thomas Ellis, the earliest European settler in Penticton, British Columbia.

See also
Lily of the Valley
Ruth Shorts

References

History of British Columbia
Culture of the Okanagan